Nick Jr.  was a children's cable/satellite television channel which launched in November 2011.

History 
In November 2011, MTV Networks Europe launched Nick Jr. in Russia & The CIS countries, Before its launch as a full-time channel Nick Jr. had a block on Nickelodeon. The channel broadcast on the pan-European feed of Nick Jr., so no Russian-language text appeared on channel promos, info or bumpers.

External links

Russia
Russian animation
Defunct television channels in Russia
Television channels and stations established in 2011
2011 establishments in Russia
Television stations in Georgia (country)
Television stations in Belarus
Television stations in Ukraine
Television channels in Moldova
Television stations in Tajikistan
Television stations in Kyrgyzstan
Television stations in Azerbaijan
Television stations in Turkmenistan
Television stations in Kazakhstan
Television stations in Armenia
Russian-language television stations